Joseph-Aurèle Plourde,  (January 12, 1915 – January 5, 2013) was a Canadian Roman Catholic Archbishop of Ottawa, Ontario.

Early years
Archbishop Plourde was born in Saint-François-de-Madawaska, New Brunswick to Antoine Plourde and Suzanne Albert, the eighth of 11 children. and attended the St. Joseph College in Memramcook, New Brunswick and Holy Heart Seminary in Halifax, Nova Scotia before becoming ordained as a priest in 1944. Besides his priesthood, Plourde was also professor of social studies and philosophy at Saint-Louis College in Edmundston, New Brunswick.

Appointments
In 1964 he was appointed Auxiliary Bishop of Alexandria in Ontario and in 1967, he was made Archbishop of Roman Catholic Archdiocese of Ottawa. In 1966 and 1967, Archbishop Plourde, among many other activities during his ministry, was instrumental in chairing a committee that set up the Canadian bishops' international development agency (the Canadian Catholic Organization for Development and Peace). He attended the Second Vatican Council and helped to restructure the Canadian bishops' conference- the Canadian Catholic Conference, which was renamed the Canadian Conference of Catholic Bishops in 1977 (he served as President of the Conference from 1969-1971). Archbishop Plourde was also a Vice President and a founding member of the Ontario Conference of Catholic Bishops, now the Assembly of Catholic Bishops of Ontario. Archbishop Plourde retired as Archbishop of Ottawa in 1989, serving as an Archbishop Emeritus until his death in 2013. He was succeeded in 1989 as Archbishop of Ottawa by Archbishop Marcel André J. Gervais, who served until 2007.

In 1989, Archbishop Plourde was made an Officer of the Order of Canada.

Archbishop Plourde died on January 5, 2013, in Ottawa, at the age of 97. Ottawa's Archbishop Terrence Prendergast, SJ was scheduled to celebrate his predecessor's Funeral Mass on Friday, January 11, 2013, at Notre-Dame Cathedral Basilica. Immediately afterward, Archbishop Plourde's remains were to be entombed in the Archbishop's Chapel at the Cathedral Basilica.

Unexamined role in Ottawa child-sexual abuse cases within diocese
Publicly available records from the 1980s raise serious questions about Plourde's accountability and knowledge of widespread sexual abuse of children by several priests within the Ottawa diocese throughout the 1970s and early 1980s: all occurring under his tenure as archbishop. Newspaper and court records from the 1980s document cases involving at least 11 abuser priests: all of whom were under Plourde's authority as archbishop of the Ottawa diocese.

Newspaper reports from 1986 note that parents of the abuse victims "approached police in March of that year after becoming frustrated by the inaction of Archbishop Plourde and Bishop Beahan." In June 1986, Plourde was quoted on the record blaming the media, parishioners and the victims' families for having come forward with allegations that ultimately led to the criminal conviction of Dale Crampton, among other priests within his diocese. Allegations also surfaced on the public record in 1986 that Plourde had threatened one of the earliest whistleblowers with excommunication for "scandalmongering," should they go public with their claims about Crampton. Questions about Plourde's role were raised in a June 2, 1986 Ottawa Citizen editorial in the wake of Crampton's arrest. "Circumstances surrounding allegations that two local priests have been sexually abusing children compel one to question the way church officials have handled complaints of abuse. The evidence suggests the best interests of children may have been submerged beneath the clergy’s inclination to protect its own."

New allegations surfaced in May 2016, when retired Catholic priest Barry McGrory publicly admitted that he sexually abused three young parishioners at Ottawa’s Holy Cross Parish in the 1970s and ’80s. This also occurred under Plourde's tenure as archbishop of the Ottawa diocese. These allegations were reported by The Ottawa Citizen including McGrory's claims that Plourde was aware of the abuse occurring within his diocese. These allegations have yet to be tested in court. Also in 2016--more than 35 years after these criminal acts took place--the Ottawa archdiocese and its current archbishop publicly acknowledged "the enormity of evil" in connection to these cases, but remained mute on Plourde's knowledge of the abuses that occurred under his watch.

To this date, the Ottawa archdiocese refuses to comment on or confirm the total number of sexual abuse cases before the courts in which it is named as defendant.

References

 Diocese repeatedly warned about Ottawa clergy’s most notorious abuser | Ottawa Citizen
 Ottawa Citizen - Google News Archive Search 
 Ottawa Citizen - Google News Archive Search

External links 
 Catholic-Hierarchy

1915 births
2013 deaths
Officers of the Order of Canada
Participants in the Second Vatican Council
People from Madawaska County, New Brunswick
20th-century Roman Catholic archbishops in Canada
Roman Catholic bishops of Alexandria–Cornwall
Roman Catholic archbishops of Ottawa–Cornwall